Shevinskaya is a rural locality (a village) in Ivanovskoye Rural Settlement, Kovrovsky District, Vladimir Oblast, Russia. The population was 285 as of 2010. There are 3 streets.

Geography 
Shevinskaya is located 53 km southeast of Kovrov (the district's administrative centre) by road. Novoberezovo is the nearest rural locality.

References 

Rural localities in Kovrovsky District